Eunapius is a genus of sponges belonging to the family Spongillidae.

The genus has almost cosmopolitan distribution.

Species:

Eunapius aetheriae 
Eunapius ambiguus 
Eunapius calcuttanus 
Eunapius subterraneus

References

Spongillidae
Sponge genera